Stylidium austrocapense is a dicotyledonous plant that belongs to the genus Stylidium (family Stylidiaceae). The specific epithet austrocapense refers to this species' native range on the southern part of Cape York Peninsula in Australia. It is an herbaceous annual plant that grows from 9 to 18 cm tall. Oblanceolate or elliptical leaves, about 4-40 per plant, form a basal rosette with stems absent. The leaves are generally 7.5–31 mm long and 2–10 mm wide. This species produces 1-10 scapes per plant that are glandular-hairy. Inflorescences are 9–18 cm long and produce pink or red flowers that bloom from April to July in their native range. S. austrocapense is endemic to the Cape York Peninsula in Queensland, Australia. Its typical habitat has been reported as coarse white sandy soils on low hills or intermittent watercourses. Dominant vegetation in association with its habitat include Eucalyptus tetrodonta, E. clarksoniana, Melaleuca viridiflora, M. nervosa, and Xanthorrhoea johnsonii. S. austrocapense is most closely related to S. multiscapum, but differs by the shorter leaves and absent paracorolla. Its conservation status has been assessed as secure.

See also 
 List of Stylidium species

References 

Asterales of Australia
Carnivorous plants of Australia
Flora of Queensland
austrocapense
Plants described in 1999